TUGE Energia is a wind turbine manufacturer headquartered in Estonia. It manufactures and supplies small wind turbines with capacity of 2, 10 and 50 kW.

The company was founded in 2015 in Tallinn. At the beginning of 2017, it has more than 20 small wind turbines installed in Estonia and Finland. The company also provides complementary solar and battery storage solutions.

The company is a member of a World Wind Energy Association.

Turbines
TUGE2 (2 kW wind turbine, datasheet)
TUGE10 (10 kW wind turbine, datasheet)
TUGE50 (50 kW wind turbine, datasheet)

See also
Small wind turbine
List of wind turbine manufacturers
Renewable energy industry
Wind Power

References

External links
  

Wind turbine manufacturers
Wind power in Estonia
Estonian brands